Lauria fanalensis is a species of land snail in the family Lauriidae. It is native to Madeira and the Canary Islands (El Hierro, La Palma, La Gomera and Tenerife).

This snail occurs in laurisilva habitat, where it lives in moss and lichen on the trunks of laurel trees. There are no immediate threats to the species.

References

Molluscs of Madeira
Molluscs of the Canary Islands
Lauria (gastropod)
Gastropods described in 1852
Taxa named by Richard Thomas Lowe
Taxonomy articles created by Polbot